The 2010 IIHF InLine Hockey World Championship was the 15th IIHF InLine Hockey World Championship, the premier annual international inline hockey tournament. It took place between 28 June and 4 July in Sweden. The games were played in the Löfbergs Lila Arena in Karlstad. The US team won the final against the Czech Republic 4–3 won their fifth title.

Venue

Nations
The following eight nations qualified for the elite-pool tournament. Six nations from Europe, and two nations from North America were represented.
Europe

North America

Seeding and groups

The seeding in the preliminary round was based on the final standings at the 2009 IIHF InLine Hockey World Championship and 2009 IIHF InLine Hockey World Championship Division I. The teams were grouped accordingly by seeding at the previous year's tournament (in parenthesis is the corresponding seeding):

Group A
 (1)
 (4)
 (5)
 (8)

Group B
 (2)
 (3)
 (6)
 (7)

Rosters

Each team's roster for the 2010 IIHF InLine Hockey World Championship consisted of at least 8 skaters (forwards, and defencemen) and 2 goaltenders, and at most 16 skaters and 3 goaltenders.

Preliminary round
Eight participating teams were placed in the following two groups. After playing a round-robin, the top three teams in each group advanced to the Playoff round. The last team in each group competed in the Qualification Games.

All games were played at the Löfbergs Lila Arena in Karlstad.

Group A

All times are local (UTC+2).

Group B

All times are local (UTC+2).

Qualification games
The last team from each group of the Preliminary Round competed in the Qualification Games against the top team from each group of the Division I tournament's Preliminary round. They were placed into two games: teams from Groups A and C played each other in Group A/C, while teams from Groups B and D played each other in Group B/D.

The two winners of these games advanced to the Top Division Playoff Round. In the Top Division Playoff Round, the winner of the A/C game was seeded A4, while the winner of the B/D game was seeded B4.

The two losers of these games were relegated to the Division I Playoff Round. In the Division I Playoff Round, the loser of the A/C game was seeded C1, while the winner of the B/D game was seeded D1.

Game A/C

Time is local (UTC+2).

Game B/D

Time is local (UTC+2).

Playoff round

Bracket

Quarter-finals
All times are local (UTC+2).

Placement

7/8 placement
Time is local (UTC+2).

5/6 placement
Time is local (UTC+2).

Semi-finals
All times are local (UTC+2).

Bronze medal game
Time is local (UTC+2).

Gold medal game
Time is local (UTC+2).

Ranking and statistics

Tournament Awards
Best players selected by the directorate:
Best Goalkeeper:  Roman Handl
Best Defenseman:  Sami Markkanen
Best Forward:  Nathan Sigmund
Most Valuable Player:  Dick Axelsson

Final standings
The final standings of the tournament according to IIHF:

Scoring leaders
List shows the top skaters sorted by points, then goals. If the list exceeds 10 skaters because of a tie in points, all of the tied skaters are shown.
GP = Games played; G = Goals; A = Assists; Pts = Points; +/− = Plus/minus; PIM = Penalties in minutes; POS = Position
Source: IIHF.com
18:32, 4 July 2010 (UTC) (UTC)

Leading goaltenders
Only the top five goaltenders, based on save percentage, who have played 40% of their team's minutes are included in this list.
TOI = Time on ice (minutes:seconds); SA = Shots against; GA = Goals against; GAA = Goals against average; Sv% = Save percentage; SO = Shutouts Asterisk (*) denotes that the player's team was demoted to the Division I tournament after the qualification games.
Source: IIHF.com
18:35, 4 July 2010 (UTC)

See also
2010 IIHF InLine Hockey World Championship Division I
2009 IIHF InLine Hockey World Championship
2011 IIHF InLine Hockey World Championship

References

IIHF InLine Hockey World Championship
International sports competitions hosted by Sweden
2010 in inline hockey
2010 in Swedish sport
Sports competitions in Karlstad
Inline hockey in Sweden